Victor John Lescovitz (born March 18, 1953) is a former Democratic member of the Pennsylvania House of Representatives.

He is a 1971 graduate of Fort Cherry High School. He earned a degree from Washington and Jefferson College in 1975 and a M.A. degree from the University of Pennsylvania in 1983.

He was first elected to represent the 46th legislative district in the Pennsylvania House of Representatives in a special election on March 11, 1980. He retired prior to the 2006 elections.

He is the longest serving State Representative in Washington County

References

External links
 official PA House profile
 official Party website

Living people
Democratic Party members of the Pennsylvania House of Representatives
Washington & Jefferson College alumni
1953 births
People from Canonsburg, Pennsylvania